A Passport to Hell is a 1932 American pre-Code drama film directed by Frank Lloyd and written by Leon Gordon and Bradley King. The film stars Elissa Landi, Paul Lukas, Warner Oland, Alexander Kirkland, Donald Crisp and Earle Foxe. The film was released on August 14, 1932, by Fox Film Corporation.

Synopsis
A notorious beautiful English woman (Myra) is kicked out of British West Africa to German West Africa, just before the start of World War I. She marries a German colonial official (Erich) to avoid internment. When Erich's father discovers her past he deports her. Before leaving, an English spy approaches her for help to escape with a vital military map. She must decide her allegiance. (IMDb)

Cast 
Elissa Landi as Myra Carson
Paul Lukas as Lt. Kurt Kurtoff
Warner Oland as Baron von Sydow
Alexander Kirkland as Lt. Erich von Sydow
Donald Crisp as Sgt. Snyder
Earle Foxe as Purser
Yola d'Avril as Rosita
Ivan Simpson as Simms
Eva Dennison as Mrs. Butterworth
Wilhelm von Brincken as Officer
Anders Van Haden as Immigration Officer 
Bert Sprotte as Hotel Proprietor
John Lester Johnson as Zakka
Vera Morrison as Sheba

References

External links 
 
 

1932 films
1932 drama films
American drama films
1930s English-language films
Films directed by Frank Lloyd
Fox Film films
Films set in Africa
Films set in 1914
American black-and-white films
1930s American films